Peters Hill is a mountain located in the Catskill Mountains of New York north of Hobart. Jaclyn Hill is located south of Peters Hill and Gunhouse Hill is located west.

References

Mountains of Delaware County, New York
Mountains of New York (state)